Český Dub is a town in Liberec District in the Liberec Region of the Czech Republic. It has about 2,800 inhabitants. The town centre is well preserved and is protected by law as an urban monument zone.

Administrative parts
Český Dub is made up of town parts of Český Dub I–IV and villages of Bohumileč, Hoření Starý Dub, Kněžičky, Libíč, Loukovičky, Malý Dub, Modlibohov, Smržov, Sobákov, Sobotice and Starý Dub.

Geography
The southeastern part of the municipal territory with the town proper lies in the Jičín Uplands, the northwestern part lies in the Ralsko Uplands. The town is situated at the confluence of the Ještědka and Rašovka streams.

History

Český Dub belongs to the oldest settlements in North Bohemia. The first written mention of Český Dub is from 1115. It was founded as a market settlement on a trade route, on an elevated spot between small rivers of Ještědka and Rašovka. In 1237, Český Dub became a property of Havel of Markvartice. He had built here a fortified monastery for the Order of Knights Hospitaller with the Chapel of Saint John the Baptist.

In 1552, the monastery and the late Gothic castle were rebuilt to a representative Renaissance castle. The castle burned down in 1858. In the middle of the 19th century, the town became a centre of textile industry thanks to the entrepreneur Franz von Schmitt. He also had built a Neorenaissance castle in the town.

Sights
Schmitt's Castle serves today as an institute of social services. Its English landscape garden is open to the public.

The regional Podještědské Museum was founded in 1919 and since 1945 has been located in Blaschko's Villa. It is a valuable Neorenaissance house from 1880–1881, decorated in the style of historicist Art Nouveau. It was built by Franz von Schmitt for his daughter and her husband. The museum also includes exposed underground remains of the Knights Hospitaller monastery.

There are several fragments of the town fortifications in Český Dub. The town walls were built in the 15th century.

References

External links

Cities and towns in the Czech Republic
Populated places in Liberec District